Kleber Alves da Costa Junior (born 31 May 1999), known as Kleber Juninho, is a Brazilian professional footballer who plays as a right winger.

References

External links
 
 

1999 births
Living people
People from Americana, São Paulo
Brazilian footballers
Association football forwards
União Agrícola Barbarense Futebol Clube players
Rio Claro Futebol Clube players
Rio Branco Futebol Clube players
FC Hirnyk-Sport Horishni Plavni players
Ukrainian First League players
Brazilian expatriate footballers
Expatriate footballers in Ukraine
Brazilian expatriate sportspeople in Ukraine
Footballers from São Paulo (state)